I Am Responsible is the second studio album by Swedish post-rock band EF. It was released through And The Sound Records in the UK.

Track listing

References

2008 albums
Ef (band) albums